Arthur William Cairns, 2nd Earl Cairns (21 December 1861 – 14 January 1890) was a British aristocrat, succeeding to the title on the death of his father the first Earl Cairns on 2 April 1885.

Early life
Born in London in 1861, he was the second but eldest surviving son of Mary Harriet (née MacNeile; 1833-1919) and Hugh MacCalmont Cairns, 1st Earl Cairns, a British statesman who served as Lord Chancellor of the United Kingdom during the first two ministries of Benjamin Disraeli.

Arthur Cairns was educated at Wellington College in Berkshire. Between 1875 and 1876 he attended Eton College, going on to study at Trinity College, Cambridge.

Career
Cairns became Private Secretary to the President of the Board of Trade. He succeeded to the titles of 2nd Baron Cairns of Garmoyle, County Antrim, and 2nd Viscount Garmoyle, County Antrim upon the death of his father on 2 April 1885.

Personal life
On 20 November 1884 Cairns was successfully sued for £10,000 for breach of promise of marriage by Emily Mary Finney (an actress with the stage name of May Fortescue).

He had seen her on stage in Gilbert and Sullivan's opera Iolanthe and the two struck up a relationship.  He proposed marriage, and she accepted, leaving the Savoy Theatre at the end of August 1883.  Although his family accepted Fortescue, according to The New York Times, Cairn's friends could not accept his engagement to an actress, and he broke off the engagement in January 1884, leaving the country to travel in Asia. Fortescue, assisted by W. S. Gilbert's solicitors, sued him for breach of promise, receiving £10,000 in damages.

He was also engaged to the New York heiress Adele Grant, but she broke off the engagement shortly before their wedding (and later married George Capell, 7th Earl of Essex in 1893).

Marriage and issue
On 19 December 1887, he was married to Olivia Elizabeth Berens OBE at St. Mary's Church, Bryanston Square, Marylebone, London.  His wife was a daughter of Alexander Augustus Berens and Louisa Winifred Stewart. Together, they were the parents of:

 Lady Louise Rosemary Kathleen Virginia Cairns MBE (1889–1962), who married Wyndham Portal, 1st Viscount Portal in 1909.

Cairns died of pneumonia on 14 January 1890, aged 28, at 18 Queen Street, Mayfair, London. He was buried at Bournemouth in Hampshire. He died intestate, and his estate was administered in April 1890 at £5,135.  Having only a daughter, his titles passed to his younger brother, Herbert John Cairns, 3rd Earl Cairns.  

After his death, his widow remarried to Maj. Roger Cyril Hans Sloane-Stanley of Paultons in 1899 (the High Sheriff of Hampshire in 1913), before her own death on 20 June 1951.

References

External links

Arthur Cairns on The Peerage website

1861 births
1890 deaths
People educated at Wellington College, Berkshire
People educated at Eton College
Alumni of Trinity College, Cambridge
Earls in the Peerage of the United Kingdom
Deaths from pneumonia in England